Wilhelm II or William II (Friedrich Wilhelm Viktor Albert; 27 January 18594 June 1941) was a member of the House of Hohenzollern who reigned as the last German Emperor and King of Prussia from 15 June 1888 until his abdication on 9 November 1918. Despite strengthening the German Empire's position as a great power by building a powerful navy, his tactless public statements and erratic foreign policy greatly antagonized the international community and are considered by many to be one of the underlying causes of World War I. When the German war effort collapsed after a series of crushing defeats on the Western Front in 1918, he was forced to abdicate, thereby marking the end of the German Empire and the House of Hohenzollern's 300-year reign in Prussia and 500-year reign in Brandenburg.

Born during the reign of his granduncle Frederick William IV of Prussia, Wilhelm was the son of Prince Frederick William and Victoria, Princess Royal. Through his mother, he was the eldest grandchild of Queen Victoria of the United Kingdom. In March 1888, Frederick William ascended the German and Prussian thrones as Frederick III. Frederick died just 99 days later, and his son succeeded him as Wilhelm II.

In March 1890, Wilhelm dismissed Chancellor Otto von Bismarck and assumed direct control over his nation's policies, embarking on a bellicose "New Course" to cement Germany's status as a leading world power. Over the course of his reign, the German colonial empire acquired new territories in China and the Pacific (such as Kiautschou Bay, the Northern Mariana Islands, and the Caroline Islands) and became Europe's largest manufacturer. However, Wilhelm often undermined such progress by making tactless and threatening statements towards other countries without first consulting his ministers. Likewise, his regime did much to alienate itself from other great powers by initiating a massive naval build-up, contesting French control of Morocco, and building a railway through Baghdad that challenged Britain's dominion in the Persian Gulf. By the second decade of the 20th century, Germany could rely only on significantly weaker nations such as Austria-Hungary and the declining Ottoman Empire as allies.

Wilhelm's reign culminated in Germany's guarantee of military support to Austria-Hungary during the crisis of July 1914, one of the immediate causes of World War I. A lax wartime leader, Wilhelm left virtually all decision-making regarding strategy and organisation of the war effort to the German Army's Great General Staff. By August 1916, this broad delegation of power gave rise to a de facto military dictatorship that dominated national policy for the rest of the conflict. Despite emerging victorious over Russia and obtaining significant territorial gains in Eastern Europe, Germany was forced to relinquish all its conquests after a decisive defeat on the Western Front in the autumn of 1918. Losing the support of his country's military and many of his subjects, Wilhelm was forced to abdicate during the German Revolution of 1918–1919. The revolution converted Germany from a monarchy into an unstable democratic state known as the Weimar Republic. Wilhelm fled to exile in the Netherlands, where he remained during its occupation by Nazi Germany in 1940. He died there in 1941.

Biography
Wilhelm was born in Berlin on 27 January 1859—at the Crown Prince's Palace—to Victoria, Princess Royal "Vicky", the eldest daughter of Britain's Queen Victoria, and Prince Frederick William of Prussia ("Fritz" – the future Frederick III). At the time of his birth, his granduncle, Frederick William IV, was king of Prussia. Frederick William IV had been left permanently incapacitated by a series of strokes, and his younger brother Wilhelm was acting as regent. Wilhelm was the oldest of the 42 grandchildren of his maternal grandparents (Queen Victoria and Prince Albert), but more importantly, he was the first son of the crown prince of Prussia. Upon the death of Frederick William IV in January 1861, Wilhelm's paternal grandfather (the elder Wilhelm) became king, and the two-year-old Wilhelm became second in the line of succession to Prussia. After 1871, Wilhelm also became second in the line to the newly created German Empire, which, according to the constitution of the German Empire, was ruled by the Prussian king. At the time of his birth, he was also sixth in the line of succession to the British throne, after his maternal uncles and his mother.

Traumatic birth
Shortly before midnight on 26 January 1859, Wilhelm's mother experienced labour pains, followed by her water breaking, after which Dr. August Wegner, the family's personal physician, was summoned. Upon examining Victoria, Wegner realised the infant was in the breech position; gynaecologist Eduard Arnold Martin was then sent for, arriving at the palace at 10 am on 27 January. After administering ipecac and prescribing a mild dose of chloroform, which was administered by Victoria's personal physician Sir James Clark, Martin advised Fritz the unborn child's life was endangered. As mild anaesthesia did not alleviate her extreme labour pains, resulting in her "horrible screams and wails", Clark finally administered full anaesthesia. Observing her contractions to be insufficiently strong, Martin administered a dose of ergot extract, and at 2:45 pm saw the infant's buttocks emerging from the birth canal, but noticed the pulse in the umbilical cord was weak and intermittent. Despite this dangerous sign, Martin ordered a further heavy dose of chloroform so he could better manipulate the infant. Observing the infant's legs to be raised upwards and his left arm likewise raised upwards and behind his head, Martin "carefully eased out the Prince's legs". Due to the "narrowness of the birth canal", he then forcibly pulled the left arm downwards, tearing the brachial plexus, then continued to grasp the left arm to rotate the infant's trunk and free the right arm, likely exacerbating the injury. After completing the delivery, and despite realising the newborn prince was hypoxic, Martin turned his attention to the unconscious Victoria. Noticing after some minutes that the newborn remained silent, Martin and the midwife Fräulein Stahl worked frantically to revive the prince; finally, despite the disapproval of those present, Stahl spanked the newborn vigorously until "a weak cry escaped his pale lips".

Modern medical assessments have concluded Wilhelm's hypoxic state at birth, due to the breech delivery and the heavy dosage of chloroform, left him with minimal to mild brain damage, which manifested itself in his subsequent hyperactive and erratic behaviour, limited attention span and impaired social abilities. The brachial plexus injury resulted in Erb's palsy, which left Wilhelm with a withered left arm about  shorter than his right. He tried with some success to conceal this; many photographs show him holding a pair of white gloves in his left hand to make the arm seem longer. In others, he holds his left hand with his right, has his disabled arm on the hilt of a sword, or holds a cane to give the illusion of a useful limb posed at a dignified angle. Historians have suggested that this disability affected his emotional development.

Early years

In 1863, Wilhelm was taken to England to be present at the wedding of his Uncle Bertie (later King Edward VII), and Princess Alexandra of Denmark. Wilhelm attended the ceremony in a Highland costume, complete with a small toy dirk. During the ceremony, the four-year-old became restless. His eighteen-year-old uncle Prince Alfred, charged with keeping an eye on him, told him to be quiet, but Wilhelm drew his dirk and threatened Alfred. When Alfred attempted to subdue him by force, Wilhelm bit him on the leg. His grandmother, Queen Victoria, missed seeing the fracas; to her Wilhelm remained "a clever, dear, good little child, the great favourite of my beloved Vicky".

His mother, Vicky, was obsessed with his damaged arm, blaming herself for the child's handicap and insisted that he become a good rider. The thought that he, as heir to the throne, should not be able to ride was intolerable to her. Riding lessons began when Wilhelm was eight and were a matter of endurance for Wilhelm. Over and over, the weeping prince was set on his horse and compelled to go through the paces. He fell off time after time but despite his tears, was set on its back again. After weeks of this he was finally able to maintain his balance.

Wilhelm, from six years of age, was tutored and heavily influenced by the 39-year-old teacher Georg Ernst Hinzpeter. "Hinzpeter", he later wrote, "was really a good fellow. Whether he was the right tutor for me, I dare not decide. The torments inflicted on me, in this pony riding, must be attributed to my mother."

As a teenager he was educated at Kassel at the Friedrichsgymnasium. In January 1877, Wilhelm finished high school and on his eighteenth birthday received as a present from his grandmother, Queen Victoria, the Order of the Garter. After Kassel he spent four terms at the University of Bonn, studying law and politics. He became a member of the exclusive Corps Borussia Bonn. Wilhelm possessed a quick intelligence, but this was often overshadowed by a cantankerous temper.

As a scion of the royal house of Hohenzollern, Wilhelm was exposed from an early age to the military society of the Prussian aristocracy. This had a major impact on him and, in maturity, Wilhelm was seldom seen out of uniform. The hyper-masculine military culture of Prussia in this period did much to frame his political ideals and personal relationships.

Wilhelm was in awe of his father, whose status as a hero of the wars of unification was largely responsible for the young Wilhelm's attitude, as were the circumstances in which he was raised; close emotional contact between father and son was not encouraged. Later, as he came into contact with the Crown Prince's political opponents, Wilhelm came to adopt more ambivalent feelings toward his father, perceiving the influence of Wilhelm's mother over a figure who should have been possessed of masculine independence and strength. Wilhelm also idolised his grandfather, Wilhelm I, and he was instrumental in later attempts to foster a cult of the first German Emperor as "Wilhelm the Great". However, he had a distant relationship with his mother.

Wilhelm resisted attempts by his parents, especially his mother, to educate him in a spirit of British liberalism. Instead, he agreed with his tutors' support of autocratic rule, and gradually became thoroughly 'Prussianized' under their influence. He thus became alienated from his parents, suspecting them of putting Britain's interests first. The German Emperor, Wilhelm I, watched as his grandson, guided principally by the Crown Princess Victoria, grew to manhood. When Wilhelm was nearing 21, the Emperor decided it was time his grandson should begin the military phase of his preparation for the throne. He was assigned as a lieutenant to the First Regiment of Foot Guards, stationed at Potsdam. "In the Guards," Wilhelm said, "I really found my family, my friends, my interests—everything of which I had up to that time had to do without." As a boy and a student, his manner had been polite and agreeable; as an officer, he began to strut and speak brusquely in the tone he deemed appropriate for a Prussian officer.

When Wilhelm was in his early twenties, Chancellor Otto von Bismarck tried to separate him from his parents, who opposed Bismarck and his policies, with some success. Bismarck planned to use the young prince as a weapon against his parents in order to retain his own political dominance. Wilhelm thus developed a dysfunctional relationship with his parents, but especially with his English mother. In an outburst in April 1889, Wilhelm angrily implied that "an English doctor killed my father, and an English doctor crippled my arm—which is the fault of my mother", who allowed no German physicians to attend to herself or her immediate family.

As a young man, Wilhelm fell in love with one of his maternal first cousins, Princess Elisabeth of Hesse-Darmstadt. She turned him down, and in time, married into the Russian imperial family. In 1880 Wilhelm became engaged to Augusta Victoria of Schleswig-Holstein, known as "Dona". The couple married on 27 February 1881, and remained married for 40 years, until her death in 1921. In a period of 10 years, between 1882 and 1892, Augusta Victoria bore Wilhelm seven children, six sons and a daughter.

Beginning in 1884, Bismarck began advocating that Kaiser Wilhelm send his grandson on diplomatic missions, a privilege denied to the Crown Prince. That year, Prince Wilhelm was sent to the court of Tsar Alexander III of Russia in St. Petersburg to attend the coming of age ceremony of the 16-year-old Tsarevich Nicholas. Wilhelm's behaviour did little to ingratiate himself to the tsar. Two years later, Kaiser Wilhelm I took Prince Wilhelm on a trip to meet with Emperor Franz Joseph I of Austria-Hungary. In 1886, also, thanks to Herbert von Bismarck, the son of the Chancellor, Prince Wilhelm began to be trained twice a week at the Foreign Ministry.

Accession
Kaiser Wilhelm I died in Berlin on 9 March 1888, and Prince Wilhelm's father ascended the throne as Frederick III. He was already experiencing an incurable throat cancer and spent all 99 days of his reign fighting the disease before dying. On 15 June of that same year, his 29-year-old son succeeded him as German Emperor and King of Prussia.

Although in his youth he had been a great admirer of Otto von Bismarck, Wilhelm's characteristic impatience soon brought him into conflict with the "Iron Chancellor", the dominant figure in the foundation of his empire. The new Emperor opposed Bismarck's careful foreign policy, preferring vigorous and rapid expansion to protect Germany's "place in the sun". Furthermore, the young Emperor had come to the throne determined to rule as well as reign, unlike his grandfather. While the letter of the imperial constitution vested executive power in the emperor, Wilhelm I had been content to leave day-to-day administration to Bismarck. Early conflicts between Wilhelm II and his chancellor soon poisoned the relationship between the two men. Bismarck believed that Wilhelm was a lightweight who could be dominated, and he showed scant respect for Wilhelm's policies in the late 1880s. The final split between monarch and statesman occurred soon after an attempt by Bismarck to implement a far-reaching anti-Socialist law in early 1890.

Rift with Bismarck
 
The young Kaiser allegedly rejected Bismarck's "peaceful foreign policy" and instead plotted with senior generals to work "in favour of a war of aggression". Bismarck told an aide, "That young man wants war with Russia, and would like to draw his sword straight away if he could. I shall not be a party to it."

Bismarck, after gaining an absolute majority in the Reichstag in favour of his policies, decided to push through legislation making his Anti-Socialist Laws permanent. His Kartell, the majority of the amalgamated German Conservative Party and the National Liberal Party, favoured making the laws permanent, with one exception: the police power to expel Socialist agitators from their homes. The Kartell split over this issue and nothing was passed.

As the debate continued, Wilhelm became more and more interested in social problems, especially the treatment of mine workers who went on strike in 1889. He routinely argued with Bismarck in the council to make it clear where he stood on social policy. Bismarck, in turn, sharply disagreed with Wilhelm's pro-labor union policies and worked to circumvent them. Bismarck, feeling pressured and unappreciated by the young Emperor and undermined by his ambitious advisors, refused to sign a proclamation regarding the protection of workers along with Wilhelm, as was required by the German Constitution.

While Bismarck had previously sponsored landmark social security legislation, by 1889–90, he had become violently opposed to the rise of organized labor. In particular, he was opposed to wage increases, improving working conditions, and regulating labour relations. Moreover, the Kartell, the shifting coalition government that Bismarck had been able to maintain since 1867, had finally lost its majority of seats in the Reichstag.

The final break between the Iron Chancellor and the Monarchy came when Bismarck searched for a new parliamentary majority after his Kartell was voted from power due to the Anti-Socialist Laws fiasco. The remaining powers in the Reichstag were the Catholic Centre Party and the Conservative Party.

In most parliamentary systems, the head of government depends upon the confidence of the parliamentary majority and has the right to form coalitions to maintain a majority of supporters. In a constitutional monarchy, however, the Chancellor also cannot afford to make an enemy of the monarch, who has plenty of means at his or her disposal of quietly blocking a Chancellor's policy objectives. For these reasons, the Kaiser believed that he had the right to be informed before The Iron Chancellor began coalition talks with the Opposition.

In a deeply ironic moment, a mere decade after demonizing Germany's Catholics as traitors during the Kulturkampf, Bismarck decided to start coalition talks with the all-Catholic Centre Party, and invited that party's leader in the Reichstag, Baron Ludwig von Windthorst, to meet with him to begin the negotiations. Despite having a warm relationship with Baron von Windthorst, Kaiser Wilhelm was furious to hear about the plans for coalition talks only after they had already begun.

After a heated argument at Bismarck's estate over the latter's alleged disrespect for the monarchy, Wilhelm stormed out. Bismarck, forced for the first time in his career into a crisis that he could not twist to his own advantage, wrote a blistering letter of resignation, decrying Wilhelm's involvement in both foreign and domestic policy, which was published only after Bismarck's death.

At the opening of the Reichstag on 6 May 1890, the Kaiser stated that the most pressing issue was the further enlargement of the bill concerning the protection of the labourer. In 1891, the Reichstag passed the Workers Protection Acts, which improved working conditions, protected women and children and regulated labour relations.

Wilhelm in control

Dismissal of Bismarck

Bismarck resigned at Wilhelm II's insistence in 1890, at the age of 75. He was succeeded as Chancellor of Germany and Minister-President of Prussia by Leo von Caprivi, who in turn was replaced by Chlodwig, Prince of Hohenlohe-Schillingsfürst, in 1894. Following the dismissal of Hohenlohe in 1900, Wilhelm appointed the man whom he regarded as "his own Bismarck", Bernhard von Bülow.

In foreign policy Bismarck had achieved a fragile balance of interests between Germany, France and Russia – peace was at hand and Bismarck tried to keep it that way despite growing popular sentiment against Britain (regarding colonies) and especially against Russia. With Bismarck's dismissal, the Russians now expected a reversal of policy in Berlin, so they quickly came to terms with France, beginning a process that by 1914 largely isolated Germany.

In later years, Bismarck created the "Bismarck myth"; the view (which some historians have argued was confirmed by subsequent events) that Wilhelm II's successful demand for the Iron Chancellor's resignation destroyed any chance Imperial Germany ever had of stable government and international peace. According to this view, what Kaiser Wilhelm termed "The New Course" is characterised as Germany's ship of state going dangerously off course, leading directly to the carnage of the First and Second World Wars.

In contrast, historian Modris Eksteins has argued that Bismarck's dismissal was actually long overdue. According to Eksteins, the Iron Chancellor, in his need for a scapegoat, had demonized Classical Liberals in the 1860s, Roman Catholics in the 1870s, and Socialists in the 1880s with the highly successful and often repeated refrain, "The Reich is in danger." Therefore, in order to divide and rule, Bismarck ultimately left the German people even more divided in 1890 than they had ever been before 1871.

In appointing Caprivi and then Hohenlohe, Wilhelm was embarking upon what is known to history as "the New Course", in which he hoped to exert decisive influence in the government of the empire. There is debate amongst historians as to the precise degree to which Wilhelm succeeded in implementing "personal rule" in this era, but what is clear is the very different dynamic which existed between the Crown and its chief political servant (the Chancellor) in the "Wilhelmine Era". These chancellors were senior civil servants and not seasoned politician-statesmen like Bismarck. Wilhelm wanted to preclude the emergence of another Iron Chancellor, whom he ultimately detested as being "a boorish old killjoy" who had not permitted any minister to see the Emperor except in his presence, keeping a stranglehold on effective political power. Upon his enforced retirement and until his dying day, Bismarck became a bitter critic of Wilhelm's policies, but without the support of the supreme arbiter of all political appointments (the Emperor) there was little chance of Bismarck exerting a decisive influence on policy.

In the early twentieth century, Wilhelm began to concentrate upon his real agenda: the creation of a German Navy that would rival that of Britain and enable Germany to declare itself a world power. He ordered his military leaders to read Admiral Alfred Thayer Mahan's book, The Influence of Sea Power upon History, and spent hours drawing sketches of the ships that he wanted built. Bülow and Bethmann Hollweg, his loyal chancellors, looked after domestic affairs, while Wilhelm began to spread alarm in the chancellories of Europe with his increasingly eccentric views on foreign affairs.

Promoter of arts and sciences
Wilhelm enthusiastically promoted the arts and sciences, as well as public education and social welfare. He sponsored the Kaiser Wilhelm Society for the promotion of scientific research; it was funded by wealthy private donors and by the state and comprised a number of research institutes in both pure and applied sciences. The Prussian Academy of Sciences was unable to avoid the Kaiser's pressure and lost some of its autonomy when it was forced to incorporate new programs in engineering, and award new fellowships in engineering sciences as a result of a gift from the Kaiser in 1900.

Wilhelm supported the modernisers as they tried to reform the Prussian system of secondary education, which was rigidly traditional, elitist, politically authoritarian, and unchanged by the progress in the natural sciences. As hereditary Protector of the Order of Saint John, he offered encouragement to the Christian order's attempts to place German medicine at the forefront of modern medical practice through its system of hospitals, nursing sisterhood and nursing schools, and nursing homes throughout the German Empire. Wilhelm continued as Protector of the Order even after 1918, as the position was in essence attached to the head of the House of Hohenzollern.

Personality

Historians have frequently stressed the role of Wilhelm's personality in shaping his reign. Thus, Thomas Nipperdey concludes he was

Historian David Fromkin states that Wilhelm had a love–hate relationship with Britain. According to Fromkin,
"From the outset, the half-German side of him was at war with the half-English side. He was wildly jealous of the British, wanting to be British, wanting to be better at being British than the British were, while at the same time hating them and resenting them because he never could be fully accepted by them".

Langer et al. (1968) emphasise the negative international consequences of Wilhelm's erratic personality:
"He believed in force, and the 'survival of the fittest' in domestic as well as foreign politics ... William was not lacking in intelligence, but he did lack stability, disguising his deep insecurities by swagger and tough talk. He frequently fell into depressions and hysterics ... William's personal instability was reflected in vacillations of policy. His actions, at home as well as abroad, lacked guidance, and therefore often bewildered or infuriated public opinion. He was not so much concerned with gaining specific objectives, as had been the case with Bismarck, as with asserting his will. This trait in the ruler of the leading Continental power was one of the main causes of the uneasiness prevailing in Europe at the turn-of-the-century".

Relationships with foreign relatives

As a grandchild of Queen Victoria, Wilhelm was a first cousin of King George V of the United Kingdom, as well as of queens Marie of Romania, Maud of Norway, Victoria Eugenie of Spain, and the empress Alexandra of Russia. In 1889, Wilhelm's younger sister, Sophia, married the future King Constantine I of Greece. Wilhelm was infuriated by his sister's conversion from Lutheranism to Greek Orthodoxy; upon her marriage, he attempted to ban her from entering Germany.

Wilhelm's most contentious relationships were with his British relations. He craved the acceptance of his grandmother, Queen Victoria, and of the rest of her family. Despite the fact that his grandmother treated him with courtesy and tact, his other relatives largely denied him acceptance. He had an especially bad relationship with his Uncle Bertie, the Prince of Wales (later King Edward VII). Between 1888 and 1901 Wilhelm resented his uncle, who despite being an heir-apparent to the British throne, treated Wilhelm not as a reigning monarch, but merely as another nephew. In turn, Wilhelm often snubbed his uncle, whom he referred to as "the old peacock" and lorded his position as emperor over him. Beginning in the 1890s, Wilhelm made visits to England for Cowes Week on the Isle of Wight and often competed against his uncle in the yacht races. Edward's wife, the Danish-born Alexandra, also disliked Wilhelm. Even though Wilhelm had not been on the throne at the time, Alexandra felt anger over the Prussian seizure of Schleswig-Holstein from Denmark in the 1860s, and was also annoyed over Wilhelm's treatment of his mother. Despite his poor relations with his English relatives, when he received news that Queen Victoria was dying at Osborne House in January 1901, Wilhelm travelled to England and was at her bedside when she died, and he remained for the funeral. He also was present at the funeral of King Edward VII in 1910.

In 1913, Wilhelm hosted a lavish wedding in Berlin for his only daughter, Victoria Louise. Among the guests at the wedding were his cousins Tsar Nicholas II of Russia and King George V, and George's wife, Queen Mary.

Foreign affairs

German foreign policy under Wilhelm II was faced with a number of significant problems. Perhaps the most apparent was that Wilhelm was an impatient man, subjective in his reactions and affected strongly by sentiment and impulse. He was personally ill-equipped to steer German foreign policy along a rational course. There were a number of examples, such as the Kruger telegram of 1896 in which Wilhelm congratulated President Paul Kruger for preventing the Transvaal Republic from being annexed by the British Empire during the Jameson Raid.

British public opinion had been quite favourable towards the Kaiser in his first twelve years on the throne, but it turned sour in the late 1890s. During the First World War, he became the central target of British anti-German propaganda and the personification of a hated enemy.

Wilhelm invented and spread fears of a yellow peril trying to interest other European rulers in the perils they faced by invading China; few other leaders paid attention. Wilhelm used the Japanese victory in the Russo-Japanese War to try to incite fear in the west of the yellow peril that they faced by a resurgent Japan, which Wilhelm claimed would ally with China to overrun the west. Under Wilhelm, Germany invested in strengthening its colonies in Africa and the Pacific, but few became profitable and all were lost during the First World War. In South West Africa (now Namibia), a native revolt against German rule led to the Herero and Namaqua genocide, although Wilhelm eventually ordered it to be stopped.

One of the few times when Wilhelm succeeded in personal diplomacy was when in 1900 he supported the marriage of Archduke Franz Ferdinand of Austria to Countess Sophie Chotek, against the wishes of Emperor Franz Joseph I of Austria.

A domestic triumph for Wilhelm was when his daughter Victoria Louise married the Duke of Brunswick in 1913; this helped heal the rift between the House of Hanover and the House of Hohenzollern that had followed the annexation of Hanover by Prussia in 1866.

Political visits to the Ottoman Empire

In his first visit to Istanbul in 1889, Wilhelm secured the sale of German-made rifles to the Ottoman Army. Later on, he had his second political visit to the Ottoman Empire as a guest of Sultan Abdülhamid II. The Kaiser started his journey to the Ottoman Eyalets with Istanbul on 16 October 1898; then he went by yacht to Haifa on 25 October. After visiting Jerusalem and Bethlehem, the Kaiser went back to Jaffa to embark to Beirut, where he took the train passing Aley and Zahlé to reach Damascus on 7 November. While visiting the Mausoleum of Saladin the following day, the Kaiser made a speech:

On 10 November, Wilhelm went to visit Baalbek before heading to Beirut to board his ship back home on 12 November. In his second visit, Wilhelm secured a promise for German companies to construct the Berlin–Baghdad railway, and had the German Fountain constructed in Istanbul to commemorate his journey.

His third visit was on 15 October 1917, as the guest of Sultan Mehmed V.

Hun speech of 1900

The Boxer Rebellion, an anti-foreign uprising in China, was put down in 1900 by an international force known as the Eight-Nation Alliance. The Kaiser's farewell address to departing German soldiers commanded them, in the spirit of the Huns, to be merciless in battle.  Wilhelm's fiery rhetoric clearly expressed his vision for Germany as one of the great powers. There were two versions of the speech. The German Foreign Office issued an edited version, making sure to omit one particularly incendiary paragraph that they regarded as diplomatically embarrassing. The edited version was this:

The official version omitted the following passage from which the speech derives its name:

The term "Hun" later became the favoured epithet of Allied anti-German war propaganda during the First World War.

Eulenberg Scandal

In the years 1906–1909, Socialist journalist Maximilian Harden published accusations of homosexual activity involving ministers, courtiers, army officers, and Wilhelm's closest friend and advisor, Prince Philipp zu Eulenberg. According to Robert K. Massie:

The result was years of highly publicized scandals, trials, resignations, and suicides. Harden, like some in the upper echelons of the military and Foreign Office, resented Eulenberg's approval of the Anglo-French Entente, and also his encouragement of Wilhelm to rule personally. The scandal led to Wilhelm experiencing a nervous breakdown, and the removal of Eulenberg and others of his circle from the court. The view that Wilhelm was a deeply repressed homosexual is increasingly supported by scholars: certainly, he never came to terms with his feelings for Eulenberg. Historians have linked the Eulenberg scandal to a fundamental shift in German policy that heightened its military aggressiveness and ultimately contributed to World War I.

Moroccan Crisis

One of Wilhelm's diplomatic blunders sparked the Moroccan Crisis of 1905. He made a spectacular visit to Tangier, in Morocco on 31 March 1905. He conferred with representatives of Sultan Abdelaziz of Morocco. The Kaiser proceeded to tour the city on the back of a white horse. The Kaiser declared he had come to support the sovereignty of the Sultan—a statement which amounted to a provocative challenge to French influence in Morocco. The Sultan subsequently rejected a set of French-proposed governmental reforms and invited major world powers to a conference that advised him on necessary reforms.

The Kaiser's presence was seen as an assertion of German interests in Morocco, in opposition to those of France. In his speech, he even made remarks in favour of Moroccan independence, and this led to friction with France, which was expanding its colonial interests in Morocco, and to the Algeciras Conference, which served largely to further isolate Germany in Europe.

Daily Telegraph Affair

Wilhelm's most damaging personal blunder cost him much of his prestige and power and had a far greater impact in Germany than overseas. The Daily Telegraph Affair of 1908 involved the publication in Germany of an interview with a British daily newspaper that included wild statements and diplomatically damaging remarks. Wilhelm had seen the interview as an opportunity to promote his views and ideas on Anglo-German friendship, but due to his emotional outbursts during the course of the interview, he ended up further alienating not only the British, but also the French, Russians, and Japanese. He implied, among other things, that the Germans cared nothing for the British; that the French and Russians had attempted to incite Germany to intervene in the Second Boer War; and that the German naval buildup was targeted against the Japanese, not Britain. One memorable quotation from the interview was, "You English are mad, mad, mad as March hares." The effect in Germany was quite significant, with serious calls for his abdication. Wilhelm kept a very low profile for many months after the Daily Telegraph fiasco, but later exacted his revenge by forcing the resignation of the chancellor, Prince Bülow, who had abandoned the Emperor to public scorn by not having the transcript edited before its German publication. The Daily Telegraph crisis deeply wounded Wilhelm's previously unimpaired self-confidence, and he soon experienced a severe bout of depression from which he never fully recovered. He lost much of the influence he had previously exercised in domestic and foreign policy.

Naval arms race with Britain

Nothing Wilhelm did in the international arena was of more influence than his decision to pursue a policy of massive naval construction. A powerful navy was Wilhelm's pet project. He had inherited from his mother a love of the British Royal Navy, which was at that time the world's largest. He once confided to his uncle, the Prince of Wales, that his dream was to have a "fleet of my own some day". Wilhelm's frustration over his fleet's poor showing at the Fleet Review at his grandmother Queen Victoria's Diamond Jubilee celebrations, combined with his inability to exert German influence in South Africa following the dispatch of the Kruger telegram, led to Wilhelm taking definitive steps toward the construction of a fleet to rival that of his British cousins. Wilhelm called on the services of the dynamic naval officer Alfred von Tirpitz, whom he appointed to the head of the Imperial Naval Office in 1897.

The new admiral had conceived of what came to be known as the "Risk Theory" or the Tirpitz Plan, by which Germany could force Britain to accede to German demands in the international arena through the threat posed by a powerful battlefleet concentrated in the North Sea. Tirpitz enjoyed Wilhelm's full support in his advocacy of successive naval bills of 1897 and 1900, by which the German navy was built up to contend with that of the British Empire. Naval expansion under the Fleet Acts eventually led to severe financial strains in Germany by 1914, as by 1906 Wilhelm had committed his navy to construction of the much larger, more expensive dreadnought type of battleship. The British depended on naval superiority and its response was to make Germany its most feared enemy.

In addition to the expansion of the fleet, the Kiel Canal was opened in 1895, enabling faster movements between the North Sea and the Baltic Sea.
In 1889 Wilhelm reorganised top-level control of the navy by creating a Naval Cabinet equivalent to the German Imperial Military Cabinet which had previously functioned in the same capacity for both the army and navy. The Head of the Naval Cabinet was responsible for promotions, appointments, administration, and issuing orders to naval forces. Captain Gustav von Senden-Bibran was appointed as the first head and remained so until 1906. The existing Imperial admiralty was abolished, and its responsibilities divided between two organisations. Vice-Admiral Max von der Goltz was appointed in 1889 and remained in post until 1895. The first appointee was Rear Admiral Karl Eduard Heusner, followed shortly by Rear Admiral Friedrich von Hollmann from 1890 to 1897. Each of these three heads of department reported separately to Wilhelm.

World War I

Historians typically argue that Wilhelm was largely confined to ceremonial duties during the war—there were innumerable parades to review and honours to award. "The man who in peace had believed himself omnipotent became in war a 'shadow Kaiser', out of sight, neglected, and relegated to the sidelines."

The Sarajevo crisis

Wilhelm was a friend of Archduke Franz Ferdinand of Austria, and he was deeply shocked by his assassination on 28 June 1914. Wilhelm offered to support Austria-Hungary in crushing the Black Hand, the secret organisation that had plotted the killing, and even sanctioned the use of force by Austria against the perceived source of the movement—Serbia (this is often called "the blank cheque"). He wanted to remain in Berlin until the crisis was resolved, but his courtiers persuaded him instead to go on his annual cruise of the North Sea on 6 July 1914. Wilhelm made erratic attempts to stay on top of the crisis via telegram, and when the Austro-Hungarian ultimatum was delivered to Serbia, he hurried back to Berlin. He reached Berlin on 28 July, read a copy of the Serbian reply, and wrote on it:

Unknown to the Emperor, Austro-Hungarian ministers and generals had already convinced the 83-year-old Franz Joseph I of Austria to sign a declaration of war against Serbia. As a direct consequence, Russia began a general mobilisation to attack Austria in defence of Serbia.

July 1914

On the night of 30 July 1914, when handed a document stating that Russia would not cancel its mobilisation, Wilhelm wrote a lengthy commentary containing these observations:

More recent British authors state that Wilhelm II really declared, "Ruthlessness and weakness will start the most terrifying war of the world, whose purpose is to destroy Germany. Because there can no longer be any doubts, England, France and Russia have conspired themselves together to fight an annihilation war against us".

When it became clear that Germany would experience a war on two fronts and that Britain would enter the war if Germany attacked France through neutral Belgium, the panic-stricken Wilhelm attempted to redirect the main attack against Russia. When Helmuth von Moltke (the younger) (who had chosen the old plan from 1905, made by General von Schlieffen for the possibility of German war on two fronts) told him that this was impossible, Wilhelm said: "Your uncle would have given me a different answer!" Wilhelm is also reported to have said, "To think that George and Nicky should have played me false! If my grandmother had been alive, she would never have allowed it." In the original Schlieffen Plan, Germany would attack the (supposed) weaker enemy first, meaning France. The plan supposed that it would take a long time before Russia was ready for war. Defeating France had been easy for Prussia in the Franco-Prussian War in 1870. At the 1914 border between France and Germany, an attack at this more southern part of France could be stopped by the French fortress along the border. However, Wilhelm II stopped any invasion of the Netherlands.

Early War 
On 1 August 1914 (Saturday), Wilhelm II made a war speech in front of a great crowd. On Monday, he motored back to Berlin from Potsdam and issued an imperial order to convene the Reichstag the next day.

On 19 August 1914, Wilhelm II predicted that Germany will win the war. He said "I am firmly confident that, with the help of God, the bravery of the German Army and Navy and the unquenchable unanimity of the German people during those hours of danger, victory will crown our cause."

On 14 November 1914, Wilhelm II met with his cabinet and concluded that the Great War could not be won.  Nonetheless, they continued the war for four more years.

Shadow-Kaiser

Wilhelm's role in wartime was one of ever-decreasing power as he increasingly handled awards ceremonies and honorific duties. The high command continued with its strategy even when it was clear that the Schlieffen plan had failed. By 1916 the Empire had effectively become a military dictatorship under the control of Field Marshal Paul von Hindenburg and General Erich Ludendorff. Increasingly cut off from reality and the political decision-making process, Wilhelm vacillated between defeatism and dreams of victory, depending upon the fortunes of his armies. Nevertheless, Wilhelm still retained the ultimate authority in matters of political appointment, and it was only after his consent had been gained that major changes to the high command could be effected. Wilhelm was in favour of the dismissal of Colonel General Helmuth von Moltke the Younger in September 1914 and his replacement by General Erich von Falkenhayn. In 1917, Hindenburg and Ludendorff decided that Bethman-Hollweg was no longer acceptable to them as Chancellor and called upon the Kaiser to appoint somebody else. When asked whom they would accept, Ludendorff recommended Georg Michaelis, a nonentity whom he barely knew. Despite this, the Kaiser accepted the suggestion. Upon hearing in July 1917 that his cousin George V had changed the name of the British royal house to Windsor, Wilhelm remarked that he planned to see Shakespeare's play The Merry Wives of Saxe-Coburg-Gotha. The Kaiser's support base collapsed completely in October–November 1918 in the military, the civilian government, and in German public opinion, as President Woodrow Wilson made it very clear that the monarchy must be overthrown before an end of the war could take place. That year also saw Wilhelm sickened during the worldwide Spanish flu outbreak, though he survived.

Abdication and flight

Wilhelm was at the Imperial Army headquarters in Spa, Belgium, when the uprisings in Berlin and other centres took him by surprise in late 1918. Mutiny among the ranks of his beloved Kaiserliche Marine, the imperial navy, profoundly shocked him. After the outbreak of the German Revolution, Wilhelm could not make up his mind whether to abdicate. Up to that point, he accepted that he would likely have to give up the imperial crown, and still hoped to retain the Prussian kingship. However, this was impossible under the imperial constitution. Wilhelm thought he ruled as emperor in a personal union with Prussia. In truth, the constitution defined the empire as a confederation of states under the permanent presidency of Prussia. The imperial crown was thus tied to the Prussian crown, meaning that Wilhelm could not renounce one crown without renouncing the other.

Wilhelm's hope of retaining at least one of his crowns was revealed as unrealistic when, in the hope of preserving the monarchy in the face of growing revolutionary unrest, Chancellor Prince Max of Baden announced Wilhelm's abdication of both titles on 9 November 1918. Prince Max himself was forced to resign later the same day, when it became clear that only Friedrich Ebert, leader of the SPD, could effectively exert control. Later that day, one of Ebert's secretaries of state (ministers), Social Democrat Philipp Scheidemann, proclaimed Germany a republic.

Wilhelm consented to the abdication only after Ludendorff's replacement, General Wilhelm Groener, had informed him that the officers and men of the army would march back in good order under Hindenburg's command, but would certainly not fight for Wilhelm's throne. The monarchy's last and strongest support had been broken, and finally even Hindenburg, himself a lifelong monarchist, was obliged, after polling his generals, to advise the Emperor to give up the crown. On 10 November, Wilhelm crossed the border by train and went into exile in the neutral Netherlands. Upon the conclusion of the Treaty of Versailles in early 1919, Article 227 expressly provided for the prosecution of Wilhelm "for a supreme offence against international morality and the sanctity of treaties", but the Dutch government refused to extradite him. King George V wrote that he looked on his cousin as "the greatest criminal in history", but opposed Prime Minister David Lloyd George's proposal to "hang the Kaiser".  There was little zeal in Britain to prosecute. On 1 January 1920, it was stated in official circles in London that Great Britain would "welcome refusal by Holland to deliver the former kaiser for trial," and it was hinted that this had been conveyed to the Dutch government through diplomatic channels.

President Woodrow Wilson of the United States opposed extradition, arguing that prosecuting Wilhelm would destabilise international order and lose the peace.

Wilhelm first settled in Amerongen, where on 28 November he issued a belated statement of abdication from both the Prussian and imperial thrones, thus formally ending the Hohenzollerns' 500-year rule over Prussia. Accepting the reality that he had lost both of his crowns for good, he gave up his rights to "the throne of Prussia and to the German Imperial throne connected therewith". He also released his soldiers and officials in both Prussia and the empire from their oath of loyalty to him. He purchased a country house in the municipality of Doorn, known as Huis Doorn, and moved in on 15 May 1920. This was to be his home for the remainder of his life. The Weimar Republic allowed Wilhelm to remove twenty-three railway wagons of furniture, twenty-seven containing packages of all sorts, one bearing a car and another a boat, from the New Palace at Potsdam.

Life in exile
In 1922, Wilhelm published the first volume of his memoirs—a very slim volume that insisted he was not guilty of initiating the Great War, and defended his conduct throughout his reign, especially in matters of foreign policy. For the remaining twenty years of his life, he entertained guests (often of some standing) and kept himself updated on events in Europe. He grew a beard and allowed his famous moustache to droop, adopting a style very similar to that of his cousins King George V and Tsar Nicholas II. He also learned the Dutch language. Wilhelm developed a penchant for archaeology while residing at the Corfu Achilleion, excavating at the site of the Temple of Artemis in Corfu, a passion he retained in his exile. He had bought the former Greek residence of Empress Elisabeth after her murder in 1898. He also sketched plans for grand buildings and battleships when he was bored. In exile, one of Wilhelm's greatest passions was hunting, and he killed thousands of animals, both beast and bird. Much of his time was spent chopping wood and thousands of trees were chopped down during his stay at Doorn.

Wealth 
Wilhelm II was seen as the richest man in Germany before 1914. After his abdication he retained substantial wealth. It was reported that at least 60 railway wagons were needed to carry his furniture, art, porcelain and silver from Germany to the Netherlands. The kaiser retained substantial cash reserves as well as several palaces. After 1945, the Hohenzollerns' forests, farms, factories and palaces in what became East Germany were expropriated and thousands of artworks were subsumed into state-owned museums.

Views on Nazism 
In the early 1930s, Wilhelm apparently hoped that the successes of the Nazi Party would stimulate interest in a restoration of the monarchy, with his eldest grandson as the new Kaiser. His second wife, Hermine, actively petitioned the Nazi government on her husband's behalf. However, Adolf Hitler, himself a veteran of the Imperial German Army during the First World War, felt nothing but contempt for the man he blamed for Germany's greatest defeat, and the petitions were ignored. Though he played host to Hermann Göring at Doorn on at least one occasion, Wilhelm grew to distrust Hitler. Hearing of the murder of the wife of former Chancellor Kurt von Schleicher during the Night of the Long Knives, Wilhelm said, "We have ceased to live under the rule of law and everyone must be prepared for the possibility that the Nazis will push their way in and put them up against the wall!"

Wilhelm was also appalled at the Kristallnacht of 9–10 November 1938, saying "I have just made my views clear to Auwi [August Wilhelm, Wilhelm's fourth son] in the presence of his brothers. He had the nerve to say that he agreed with the Jewish pogroms and understood why they had come about. When I told him that any decent man would describe these actions as gangsterisms, he appeared totally indifferent. He is completely lost to our family". Wilhelm also stated, "For the first time, I am ashamed to be a German."

In the wake of the German victory over Poland in September 1939, Wilhelm's adjutant, Wilhelm von Dommes, wrote on his behalf to Hitler, stating that the House of Hohenzollern "remained loyal" and noted that nine Prussian Princes (one son and eight grandchildren) were stationed at the front, concluding "because of the special circumstances that require residence in a neutral foreign country, His Majesty must personally decline to make the aforementioned comment. The Emperor has therefore charged me with making a communication." Wilhelm greatly admired the success which Hitler was able to achieve in the opening months of the Second World War, and personally sent a congratulatory telegram when the Netherlands surrendered in May 1940: "My Fuhrer, I congratulate you and hope that under your marvellous leadership the German monarchy will be restored completely." Unimpressed, Hitler remarked to Heinz Linge, his valet, "What an idiot!"

Upon the fall of Paris a month later, Wilhelm sent another telegram: "Under the deeply moving impression of France's capitulation I congratulate you and all the German armed forces on the God-given prodigious victory with the words of Kaiser Wilhelm the Great of the year 1870: 'What a turn of events through God's dispensation!' All German hearts are filled with the chorale of Leuthen, which the victors of Leuthen, the soldiers of the Great King sang: Now thank we all our God!" In a letter to his daughter Victoria Louise, Duchess of Brunswick, he wrote triumphantly, "Thus is the pernicious Entente Cordiale of Uncle Edward VII brought to nought." In a September 1940 letter to an American journalist, Wilhelm praised Hitler's rapid early conquests as "a succession of miracles", but remarked also that "the brilliant leading Generals in this war came from My school, they fought under my command in the World War as lieutenants, captains and young majors. Educated by Schlieffen they put the plans he had worked out under me into practice along the same lines as we did in 1914."

After the German conquest of the Netherlands in 1940, the aging Wilhelm retired completely from public life. In May 1940, Wilhelm declined an offer from Winston Churchill of asylum in Britain, preferring to die at Huis Doorn.

Anti-England, anti-Semitic, and anti-Freemason views 
During his last year at Doorn, Wilhelm believed that Germany was still the land of monarchy and Christianity, while England was the land of classical liberalism and therefore of Satan and the Antichrist. He argued that the English nobility were "Freemasons thoroughly infected by Juda". Wilhelm asserted that the "British people must be liberated from Antichrist Juda. We must drive Juda out of England just as he has been chased out of the Continent."

He also believed that the Freemasons and the Jews had caused both world wars, and were aiming for a world empire financed by British and American gold, but that "Juda's plan has been smashed to pieces and they themselves swept out of the European Continent!" Continental Europe was now, Wilhelm wrote, "consolidating and closing itself off from British influences after the elimination of the British and the Jews!" The result would be a "U.S. of Europe!" In a 1940 letter to his sister Princess Margaret, Wilhelm wrote: "The hand of God is creating a new world & working  ... We are becoming the U.S. of Europe under German leadership, a united European Continent." He added: "The Jews [are] being thrust out of their nefarious positions in all countries, whom they have driven to hostility for centuries."

Also, in 1940 came what would have been his mother's 100th birthday. Despite their very troubled relationship, Wilhelm wrote to a friend, "Today the 100th birthday of my mother! No notice is taken of it at home! No 'Memorial Service' or ... committee to remember her marvellous work for the ... welfare of our German people ... Nobody of the new generation knows anything about her."

Death

Wilhelm died of a pulmonary embolism in Doorn, Netherlands, on 4 June 1941, at the age of 82, just weeks before the Axis invasion of the Soviet Union. Despite his personal animosity toward the monarchy, Hitler wanted to bring the Kaiser's body back to Berlin for a state funeral, as Hitler felt that such a funeral, with himself acting in the role of heir apparent to the throne, would be useful to exploit for propaganda. However, Wilhelm's orders that his body was not to return to Germany unless the monarchy was first restored were then revealed and were grudgingly respected. The Nazi occupation authorities arranged for a small military funeral, with only a few hundred people present. The mourners included Field Marshal August von Mackensen, fully dressed in his old Imperial Hussars uniform, Admiral Wilhelm Canaris, Colonel General Curt Haase, World War I flying ace turned Wehrmachtbefehlshaber for the Netherlands General Friedrich Christiansen, and Reichskommissar for the Netherlands Arthur Seyss-Inquart, along with a few other military advisers. However, Wilhelm's insistence that the swastika and Nazi Party regalia not be displayed at his funeral was ignored, as may accordingly be seen in the photographs of the funeral taken by a Dutch photographer.

Wilhelm was buried in a mausoleum upon the grounds of Huis Doorn, which has since become a place of pilgrimage for German monarchists, who gather there every year on the anniversary of his death to pay their homage to the last German Emperor.

Historiography
Three trends have characterised the writing about Wilhelm. First, the court-inspired writers considered him a martyr and a hero, often uncritically accepting the justifications provided in the Kaiser's own memoirs. Second, there came those who judged Wilhelm to be completely unable to handle the great responsibilities of his position, a ruler too reckless to deal with power. Third, after 1950, later scholars have sought to transcend the passions of the early 20th century and attempted an objective portrayal of Wilhelm and his rule.

On 8 June 1913, a year before the Great War began, The New York Times published a special supplement devoted to the 25th anniversary of the Kaiser's accession. The banner headline read: "Kaiser, 25 Years a Ruler, Hailed as Chief Peacemaker". The accompanying story called him "the greatest factor for peace that our time can show", and credited Wilhelm with frequently rescuing Europe from the brink of war. Until the late 1950s, Germany under the last Kaiser was depicted by most historians as an almost absolute monarchy. Partly, however, this was a deliberate deception by German civil servants and elected officials. For example, former President Theodore Roosevelt believed the Kaiser was in control of German foreign policy because Hermann Speck von Sternburg, the German ambassador in Washington and a personal friend of Roosevelt, presented to the President messages from Chancellor von Bülow as though they were messages from the Kaiser. Later historians downplayed his role, arguing that senior officials regularly learned to work around the Kaiser's back. More recently, historian John C. G. Röhl has portrayed Wilhelm as the key figure in understanding the recklessness and downfall of Imperial Germany. Thus, the argument is still made that the Kaiser played a major role in promoting the policies of both naval and colonialist expansion that caused the deterioration of Germany's relations with Britain before 1914.

Marriages and issue

Wilhelm and his first wife, Princess Augusta Victoria of Schleswig-Holstein, were married on 27 February 1881. They had seven children:

Empress Augusta, known affectionately as "Dona", was a constant companion to Wilhelm, and her death on 11 April 1921 was a devastating blow. It also came less than a year after their son Joachim committed suicide.

Remarriage

The following January, Wilhelm received a birthday greeting from a son of the late Prince Johann George Ludwig Ferdinand August Wilhelm of Schönaich-Carolath. The 63-year-old Wilhelm invited the boy and his mother, Princess Hermine Reuss of Greiz, to Doorn. Wilhelm found 35-year-old Hermine very attractive, and greatly enjoyed her company. The couple were wed in Doorn on 5 November 1922  despite the objections of Wilhelm's monarchist supporters and his children. Hermine's daughter, Princess Henriette, married the late Prince Joachim's son, Karl Franz Josef, in 1940, but divorced in 1946. Hermine remained a constant companion to the aging former emperor until his death.

Religion

Own views
In accordance with his role as the King of Prussia, Emperor Wilhelm II was a Lutheran member of the Evangelical State Church of Prussia's older Provinces. It was a United Protestant denomination, bringing together Reformed and Lutheran believers.

Attitude towards Islam
Wilhelm II was on friendly terms with the Muslim world. He described himself as a "friend" to "300 million Mohammedans". Following his trip to Constantinople (which he visited three times—an unbeaten record for any European monarch) in 1898, Wilhelm II wrote to Nicholas II that,

in response to the political competition between the Christian sects to build bigger and grander churches and monuments which made the sects appear idolatrous and turned Muslims away from the Christian message.

Antisemitism

Wilhelm's biographer Lamar Cecil identified Wilhelm's "curious but well-developed anti-Semitism", noting that in 1888 a friend of Wilhelm "declared that the young Kaiser's dislike of his Hebrew subjects, one rooted in a perception that they possessed an overweening influence in Germany, was so strong that it could not be overcome".

Cecil concludes:

In 1918, Wilhelm suggested a campaign against the "Jew-Bolsheviks" in the Baltic states, citing the example of what Turks had done to the Armenians a few years earlier.

On 2 December 1919, Wilhelm wrote to Field Marshal August von Mackensen, denouncing his own abdication as the "deepest, most disgusting shame ever perpetrated by a person in history, the Germans have done to themselves ... egged on and misled by the tribe of Judah ... Let no German ever forget this, nor rest until these parasites have been destroyed and exterminated from German soil!" Wilhelm advocated a "regular international all-worlds pogrom à la Russe" as "the best cure" and further believed that Jews were a "nuisance that humanity must get rid of some way or other. I believe the best thing would be gas!"

Documentaries and films
 William II. – The last days of the German Monarchy (original title: "Wilhelm II. – Die letzten Tage des Deutschen Kaiserreichs"), about the abdication and flight of the last German Kaiser. Germany/Belgium, 2007. Produced by seelmannfilm and German Television. Written and directed by Christoph Weinert.
Queen Victoria and the Crippled Kaiser, Channel 4, Secret History series 13; first broadcast 17 November 2013
 Barry Foster played the adult Wilhelm II in several episodes of the 1974 BBC TV series Fall of Eagles.
 Christopher Neame played Wilhelm II in the several episodes of the 1975 BBC TV series Edward the Seventh.
 Rupert Julian played Wilhelm II in the 1918 Hollywood propaganda film The Kaiser, the Beast of Berlin.
 Alfred Struwe played Wilhelm in the 1987 Polish historical drama film Magnat.
 Robert Stadlober played a young crown prince Wilhelm and friend of Rudolf, Crown Prince of Austria in the acclaimed 2006 film Kronprinz Rudolf (The Crown Prince).
 Ladislav Frej played the Kaiser in the 2008 film The Red Baron.
 Rainer Sellien played Wilhelm II in the 2014 BBC miniseries 37 Days.
 Christopher Plummer played a depressed Wilhelm II living in exile at Huis Doorn in the 2016 romantic war drama The Exception.
 Tom Hollander played Wilhelm II in the 2021 movie The King's Man.

Orders and decorations

German honours

Foreign honours

Ancestry

See also
 Ålesund, a Norwegian city rebuilt by Wilhelm II after it had been almost completely destroyed by fire in 1904
 German entry into World War I
 Rulers of Germany family tree
 Wilhelminism on society, politics, culture, art and architecture of Germany 1890–1918

References

Works cited
 .
 . online
 
 
 .
 
 
 
 
 
 
 
 
 
 
 , Archive.org.
 
 
 .
 
 .
 
 
 .
 , translated in 
 
 
 
 
 
 
 
 
 
 
 
 
 
 .
 
 
 .
 
 .
 
 "The interview of the Emperor Wilhelm II on October 28, 1908" London Daily Telegraph Online

Further reading
 Clark, Christopher M. Kaiser Wilhelm II. (2000) 271 pp. short biography by scholar
 Domeier, Norman. The Eulenburg Affair: A Cultural History of Politics in the German Empire (2015)
 Eley, Geoff. "The View From The Throne: The Personal Rule of Kaiser Wilhelm II," Historical Journal, June 1985, Vol. 28 Issue 2, pp. 469–485.
 Haardt, Oliver FR. "The Kaiser in the Federal State, 1871–1918." German History 34.4 (2016): 529–554. online
 Kohut, Thomas A. Wilhelm II and the Germans: A Study in Leadership, New York: Oxford University Press, 1991. .
 Langer, William L. The Diplomacy of Imperialism, 1890–1902  (1935)online
 
 Mommsen, Wolfgang J. "Kaiser Wilhelm II and German Politics." Journal of Contemporary History 1990 25(2–3): 289–316.  argues his irrationality and instability made worse the weaknesses in Germany's constitutional and political systems
 Otte, T.G., "'The Winston of Germany': The British Elite and the Last German Emperor" Canadian Journal of History 36 (December 2001). They though he  was mental unstable and this helped shape British policy.
 Retallack, James. Germany in the Age of Kaiser Wilhelm II (St. Martin's Press, 1996). .
 Rich, Norman. "The Question of National Interest In Imperial German Foreign Policy: Bismarck, William II, and the Road to World War I." Naval War College Review (1973) 26#1: 28–41. online
Röhl, John C. G; Sombart, Nicolaus, eds. Kaiser Wilhelm II New Interpretations: The Corfu Papers, (Cambridge UP, 1982)
 Van der Kiste, John. Kaiser Wilhelm II: Germany's Last Emperor, Sutton Publishing, 1999. .
 Waite, Robert GL Kaiser and Führer: A Comparative Study of Personality and Politics (1998) 511 pp. Psychohistory comparing him to Adolf Hitler.

External links

 The German Emperor as shown in his public utterances
 , Google Books.
 The German emperor's speeches: being a selection from the speeches, edicts, letters, and telegrams of the Emperor William II
 
 , mostly in German
 
 
 
 Historical film documents on Wilhelm II from the time of World War I at European Film Gateway
 
 The 1922 book review of My Memoir from The Spectator

 
1859 births
1941 deaths
19th-century German emperors
20th-century German emperors
19th-century Kings of Prussia
19th-century German people
Anti-English sentiment
Anti-Judaism
Anti-Masonry
Antisemitism in Germany
Burials in Utrecht (province)
Crown Princes of Prussia
Deaths from pulmonary embolism
Dethroned monarchs
German anti-communists
German conspiracy theorists
German emperors
German exiles
German expatriates in the Netherlands
German Lutherans
German nationalists
German people of English descent
German politicians with disabilities
German racehorse owners and breeders
House of Hohenzollern
Kings of Prussia
Monarchs who abdicated
People from Berlin
People from Doorn
Pretenders to the German throne
Protestant monarchs
Royalty and nobility with disabilities
Spanish captain generals
University of Bonn alumni
Sons of emperors

Recipients of the Grand Cross of the Iron Cross
Recipients of the Pour le Mérite (military class)
Grand Crosses of the Military Order of Max Joseph
Recipients of the Hanseatic Cross (Bremen)
Recipients of the Hanseatic Cross (Lübeck)
Recipients of the Military Merit Cross (Mecklenburg-Schwerin), 1st class
Grand Crosses of the Order of Saint Stephen of Hungary
Grand Crosses of the Military Order of Maria Theresa
Recipients of the Order of Bravery, 1st class
Recipients of the Cross of Honour of the Order of the Dannebrog
Knights Grand Cross of the Order of Saints Maurice and Lazarus
Knights Grand Cross of the Military Order of Savoy
Recipients of the Order of the Netherlands Lion
Knights Grand Cross of the Military Order of William
Grand Crosses of the Order of the House of Orange
Knights of the Order of the Norwegian Lion
2
2
Recipients of the Order of the White Eagle (Russia)
Recipients of the Order of St. Anna, 1st class
Recipients of the Order of Saint Stanislaus (Russian), 1st class
Knights of the Golden Fleece of Spain
Grand Crosses of the Order of Vasa
Annulled Honorary Knights Grand Cross of the Royal Victorian Order
Extra Knights Companion of the Garter
Knights of Justice of the Order of St John
People stripped of honorary degrees
Children of Frederick III, German Emperor